The rainforest edge litter-skink (Lygisaurus laevis) is a species of skink found in Queensland in Australia.

References

Lygisaurus
Reptiles described in 1894
Skinks of Australia
Endemic fauna of Australia
Taxa named by Johannes Theodorus Oudemans